The 2020 General Tire 125 was the third stock car race of the 2020 ARCA Menards Series East season and the 20th iteration of the event. The race was held on Friday, August 21, 2020, in Dover, Delaware at Dover International Speedway, a  oval-shaped permanent racetrack. The race took the scheduled 125 laps to complete. At race's end, Sam Mayer of GMS Racing would hold off the field after he performed a bump and run on race dominator Ty Gibbs, earning his sixth career ARCA Menards Series East win and his second of the season. To fill out the podium, David Gilliland of DGR-Crosley and Mason Diaz of Venturini Motorsports would finish second and third, respectively.

Background 

Dover International Speedway is an oval race track in Dover, Delaware, United States that has held at least two NASCAR races since it opened in 1969. In addition to NASCAR, the track also hosted USAC and the NTT IndyCar Series. The track features one layout, a 1-mile (1.6 km) concrete oval, with 24° banking in the turns and 9° banking on the straights. The speedway is owned and operated by Dover Motorsports.

The track, nicknamed "The Monster Mile", was built in 1969 by Melvin Joseph of Melvin L. Joseph Construction Company, Inc., with an asphalt surface, but was replaced with concrete in 1995. Six years later in 2001, the track's capacity moved to 135,000 seats, making the track have the largest capacity of sports venue in the mid-Atlantic. In 2002, the name changed to Dover International Speedway from Dover Downs International Speedway after Dover Downs Gaming and Entertainment split, making Dover Motorsports. From 2007 to 2009, the speedway worked on an improvement project called "The Monster Makeover", which expanded facilities at the track and beautified the track. After the 2014 season, the track's capacity was reduced to 95,500 seats.

Entry list

Qualifying 
Qualifying was held on Friday, August 21, at 11:30 AM EST. Each driver would have two laps to set a fastest time; the fastest of the two would count as their official qualifying lap.

Full qualifying results

Race results

References 

2020 ARCA Menards Series East
NASCAR races at Dover Motor Speedway
August 2020 sports events in the United States
2020 in sports in Delaware